Bacova is an unincorporated community in Bath County, Virginia, in the United States. It was created in the early 20th century as a company town; its name is simply an abbreviation of Bath County, VA.

Hidden Valley was listed on the National Register of Historic Places in 1970.

Climate
The climate in this area has mild differences between highs and lows, and there is adequate rainfall year-round.  According to the Köppen Climate Classification system, Bacova has a marine west coast climate, abbreviated "Cfb" on climate maps.

References

Unincorporated communities in Bath County, Virginia